Zlobino is a rural locality (a village) in Vladimir, Vladimir Oblast, Russia. The population was 8 as of 2010. There are 4 streets.

References 

Rural localities in Vladimir Urban Okrug